Norma West (born 19 November 1943) is a British actress,

Born in Cape Town, South Africa, her best known television appearance was as Queen Elizabeth of York in the BBC series The Shadow of the Tower (1972).  She played the part of Number 6's observer in the  Patrick McGoohan's surreal, spy series The Prisoner ("Dance of the Dead", 1967). She also had roles in the TV programs Danger Man, Mr. Rose, Ace of Wands, A Touch of Frost, Lovejoy, The Ruth Rendell Mysteries, The Case-Book of Sherlock Holmes and an adaptation in the Miss Marple series, The Murder at the Vicarage (1986) with Joan Hickson. She played Hilary in the television adaptation of John le Carré's Smiley's People (1982) and the role of Wilhelmina Lawson in Agatha Christie's Poirot - Dumb Witness (1996).

Her film career included roles in Spaceflight IC-1 (1965), The Projected Man (1967), Battle Beneath the Earth (1967), Run a Crooked Mile (1969), Man at the Top (1973), Why Shoot the Teacher? (1977) and And the Ship Sails On (1983).

External links

References

1943 births
Living people
South African emigrants to the United Kingdom
British television actresses
South African television actresses
Actresses from Cape Town